The PSA XUD is a diesel engine designed and built by PSA - Peugeot and Citroën. It is an Indirect injection (IDI) engine, that uses a version of the Ricardo Consulting Engineers Ricardo Comet V prechamber cylinder head design. The 2.1 has 12 valves, all displacements were built either naturally aspirated or turbocharged. The XUD was the predecessor to the HDI range of engines. Early HDi Engines were a PSA design, later 16-valve engines were jointly developed with Ford.

Design
The XUD was available with either SOHC 8-valve or 12-valve heads. It was mainly applied transversally in front wheel drive vehicles, tilted by 30°. However, some applications in non-PSA vehicles had the engine installed longitudinally, with rear-wheel drive. The XUD is built in Citroën's plant in Trémery, near Metz.

The former was shared with the XU9.

Upon its release the engine was noted as one of the best diesel engines (for cars and light vans) in the world with its high power output and refinement it made all other diesel engines seem agricultural. It was also particularly light, with a ready-to-run XUD9 weighing , 15% less than a comparable diesel of the previous generation.

Vegetable oil fuel
The engine, because it is indirect injection, with a slower combustion burn time than direct injection, is suitable to run on SVO (pure vegetable oil). A feature of the Ricardo Comet pre-chamber design is that it makes the engine tolerant of low Cetane value fuels such as SVO. The viscosity of vegetable oil when cold is too great for rotary injection pumps, (in particular the weaker Lucas CAV pump, the Bosch VE fuel pump is superior), preventing it from acting as a lubricant and increasing the workload on the distributor/rotary injection pump and damaging it. The Lucas EPIC pump fitted to the 2.1 L 12 valve turbo-diesel engine after 1995 is the weakest pump of all.

XUD7
All are Diesel engines.

XUD9

Both turbocharged and naturally aspirated versions were produced. Most turbocharged versions feature an intercooler, although a limited number of installations in the Citroën Xantia featured a Turbocharger without intercooler. Both engines also featured either a Bosch or a Lucas mechanical fuel pump and injectors. The engine version with the Bosch pump is known to have been run with vegetable oil. The original XUD9 engine is known as the "square port" engine, as its cylinder head has square exhaust ports. Later (and noticeably improved) XUD9A engines have oval ports.

PSA Group licensed a modified version of the naturally aspirated version of the engine with a catalytic converter designated the XUD9/Z to Hyundai which was rated at 50kw. It was used in the European specification of the Lantra (1996–1999).

XUD11
The XUD11 was available in two displacements:
  — XUD11 A naturally aspirated
  — XUD11 ATE/BTE turbocharged

Both were 12-valve SOHC engines with a  stroke. The BTE engines used a Lucas EPIC (Electronically Programmed Injection Control) fuel pump, whereas the ATE engines used a Bosch injection pump with a throttle cable.

Vehicles
The engine has been installed into the following vehicles:-

Auverland A3
Citroën BX
Citroën Visa
Citroën C15
Citroën ZX
Citroën Xsara
Citroën Berlingo
Citroën Xantia
Citroën XM
Eurovan (PSA/Fiat joint venture) Sevel Nord
Citroën Evasion/Synergie/C8
Citroën Jumpy (Dispatch in UK)
Fiat Ulysse
Fiat Scudo
Peugeot 806/807
Peugeot Expert
Lancia Zeta/Phedra
 Sevel Sud - Larger Panel Van PSA/Fiat Ducato joint venture 
Citroën C25
Citroën Jumper (Relay in UK)
Peugeot J5 (Talbot Express in UK)
Peugeot Boxer

FSO Polonez/Caro
Honda Concerto (badge engineered Rover 200 diesel for European market)
Hyundai Lantra
Lada Niva
LDV 200/Pilot
Peugeot 205
Peugeot 305
Peugeot 306
Peugeot 309
Peugeot 405
Peugeot 406
Peugeot 605
Peugeot Partner
Suzuki Baleno
Suzuki Samurai (Santana) 
Suzuki Vitara (Santana)
Talbot Horizon
Tata Telcoline / Tata Telcosport
Rover 200
Rover 400
UMM ALTER 2000

References

Guide des moteurs Peugeot Citroën (in French)

XUD
Diesel engines by model
Straight-four engines

fr:XU (moteur)